The 2004–2005 Alaska Aces season was the 19th season of the franchise in the Philippine Basketball Association (PBA).

Draft picks

Roster

Philippine Cup

Game log

|- bgcolor="#edbebf"
| 1
| October 8
| Talk 'N Text
| 86–94
| Cortez (22)
| 
| 
| Makati Coliseum
| 0–1
|- bgcolor="#edbebf"
| 2
| October 14
| Coca-Cola
| 68–71
| Cortez (16) Allado (16)
| 
| 
| Butuan
| 0–2
|- bgcolor="#edbebf"
| 3
| October 17
| FedEx
| 90–98
| Thoss (17)
| 
| 
| Araneta Coliseum
| 0–3
|- bgcolor="#bbffbb"
| 4
| October 20
| Red Bull
| 79-71
| Thoss (21)
| Thoss (15)
| 
| Araneta Coliseum
| 1–3 
|- bgcolor="#edbebf"
| 5
| October 24
| San Miguel
| 67–75
| Hugnatan (21) 
| 
| 
| Araneta Coliseum
| 1–4
|- bgcolor="#bbffbb"
| 6
| October 28
| Shell
| 78–80 OT
| Cariaso (18)
| 
| 
| Iloilo City
| 1–5

|-bgcolor="#edbebf"
| 14
| December 1
| Shell
| 85–89
| Cariaso (29)
| 
| 
| Araneta Coliseum
| 5–9
|-bgcolor="#bbffbb"
| 15
| December 9
| FedEx
| 114-102
| 
| 
| 
| Urdaneta City
| 6–9
|-bgcolor="#bbffbb"
| 16
| December 12
| Brgy.Ginebra
| 102-88 
| Cablay (16)
| 
| 
| Araneta Coliseum
| 7–9
|-bgcolor="#bbffbb"
| 17
| December 17
| Purefoods
| 86-70
| Cortez (16)
| 
| 
| Ynares Center
| 8–9

|-bgcolor="#bbffbb"
| 18
| January 5
| Sta. Lucia
| 105-95
| Cablay (22)
| 
| 
| Philsports Arena
| 9–9

Transactions

Trades

Additions

Recruited imports

GP – Games played

References

Alaska Aces (PBA) seasons
Alaska